Ghana National Gas Company is the state Agency that has the mandate to operate infrastructure required for the gathering, processing, transporting and marketing of natural gas resources in Ghana.

History
The company was incorporated in July 2011 by the Government of Ghana .

See also

Atuabo
Atuabo Gas Plant

References

Oil and gas companies of Ghana
Natural gas companies
Energy companies established in 2011
Ghanaian companies established in 2011